Edayoor is an Indian village.

Geography 
Edayoor is located in Kuttippuram Block in Malappuram district of the Indian state of Kerala, It belongs to North Kerala Division . It is located 17 KM South of district headquarters Malappuram.

Irimbilayam (8 KM), Moorkkanad (8 KM), Athavanad (8 KM), Marakkara (9 KM), Puzhakkattiri (11 KM) are nearby.. Edayoor is surrounded by Mankada Block to the North, Pattambi Block to the East, Vengara Block to the North and Trithala Block to the South .

Malappuram, Perinthalmanna, Tirur and Ponnani are nearby cities.

Demographics
 India census, Edayoor had a population of 30,462 with 14,702 males and 15,760 females.

Transport
Edayoor village connects through Kuttippuram town. National highway No.66 passes through Edappal and the northern stretch connects to Goa and Mumbai. The southern stretch connects to Cochin and Trivandrum.  National Highway No.966 connects to Palakkad and Coimbatore. The nearest airport is at Kozhikode. The nearest major railway station is at Kuttippuram.

Notables 

 Ahmad Kutty, an internationally recognized Islamic scholar and father to Faisal Kutty, a renowned law professor, lawyer, columnist and public speaker.

References

Villages in Malappuram district
Kuttippuram area